Naursky District (Nevran khoşt) is an administrative and municipal district (raion), one of the fifteen in the Chechen Republic, Russia. It is located in the northwest of the republic. Its administrative center is the rural locality (a stanitsa) of Naurskaya. Population:  51,143 (2002 Census);  The population of Naurskaya accounts for 16.5% of the district's total population.

History
In the second half of the 18th century, the area was settled by the Russian and Ukrainian Cossacks. Several stanitsas were founded. In 1771, after being wounded at the siege of Bender, the future Cossack insurgency leader Yemelyan Pugachev came to live at Ishcherskaya with his family.

The modern district was created in 1935 by the order of the Supreme Soviet. It was a part of Stavropol Krai prior to 1944 when it was transferred to newly created Grozny Oblast. After the Chechens were allowed to return in 1957, the district remained a part of the restored Chechen-Ingush ASSR.

Economy
Its agriculture is dominated by livestock breeding, especially in the north of the district (often subject to field erosion, caused by severe climatic circumstances), but there are vineyards in the south.

References

Notes

Sources

Districts of Chechnya